Tuomas Tarkki (born February 28, 1980) is a Finnish former professional ice hockey goaltender, currently serving as director of goaltending coaching for the under-18 (U18) team of Vaasan Sport in the U18 SM-sarja and as an assistant coach to the Finnish women's national U18 team. He played college ice hockey in the NCAA and professionally in the Finnish Liiga, the American Hockey League (AHL), the Swedish Elitserien, the Kontinental Hockey League (KHL), the Czech Extraliga, and the Danish Metal Ligaen.

Playing career
After playing junior hockey with Lukko, including three SM-liiga games as a backup, Tarkki studied at the Northern Michigan University and played four years of college hockey with the Northern Michigan Wildcats men's ice hockey program, being named the top goalie in the NCAA in 2005. After college hockey he spent a year in the minor leagues before returning to Finland to replace the injured Andy Chiodo as the Kärpät starting goaltender.

On December 9, 2006, Tarkki made SM-liiga history by facing his younger brother, Iiro Tarkki, who was in goal for SaiPa. This was the first time in the league that two brothers had played against each other in goal. Tuomas made 31 saves and registered a shutout while Iiro, five years his junior, allowed four goals on 20 shots.

International play
Tarkki made his debut on the Finnish national team on December 15, 2007, in the Channel One Cup on the Euro Hockey Tour, playing one game against the Czech Republic. Tarkki had a dismal game, allowing five goals on 23 shots.

Personal life
Tarkki is married to former Finnish women's national team defenseman Saija Tarkki.

Career statistics

Regular season

International

Awards and achievements

References

External links

1980 births
Living people
BK Mladá Boleslav players
Finnish ice hockey goaltenders
Chicago Wolves players
Gwinnett Gladiators players
HC Benátky nad Jizerou players
Hokki players
JYP Jyväskylä players
Lukko players
Modo Hockey players
HC Neftekhimik Nizhnekamsk players
Northern Michigan Wildcats men's ice hockey players
Northern Michigan University alumni
Oulun Kärpät players
People from Rauma, Finland
Rungsted Seier Capital players
Naisten Liiga (ice hockey) coaches
AHCA Division I men's ice hockey All-Americans
Sportspeople from Satakunta
Finnish ice hockey coaches
Finnish expatriate ice hockey players in the United States
Finnish expatriate ice hockey players in Sweden
Finnish expatriate ice hockey players in Russia
Finnish expatriate ice hockey players in the Czech Republic
Finnish expatriate ice hockey players in Denmark